Emma Webster, better known as Granny, is a Warner Bros. Cartoons character created by Friz Freleng, best known from  Looney Tunes and Merrie Melodies animated shorts of the 1950s and 1960s. She is the owner of Tweety (and more often than not, Sylvester and Hector). Her voice was first provided by Bea Benaderet from 1950 through 1955, then by June Foray for almost 60 years then Candi Milo took over in 2017 following Foray’s death.

Biography
Granny is a good-natured widow who is extremely protective of her beloved canary, Tweety. Granny's overprotectiveness becomes apparent whenever Tweety is threatened, usually by Sylvester. Although having the appearance of a kind old woman, Granny has demonstrated her cleverness in many cartoons.

At least until the mid-1950s, Granny is depicted as an elderly spinster who wears spectacles, a gray bun and a late 19th-century-like schoolmarm dress; other old fashioned characteristics include her mode of transportation (usually, a Ford Model T or a horse and buggy) and her inability to relate to present fads (such as her telling Tweety she's about to try on a new "bikini bathing suit", which turns out to be a full one-piece outfit from the turn-of-the-20th century). After 1955 — in particular, the years after Foray began voicing the character — the character's wardrobe was updated and her old-fashioned tastes and ways of life were de-emphasized, and she was sometimes given newer careers, such as a nurse or a bus driver.

Appearances
The idea of the cartoon Granny began with the Little Red Riding Hood character in spoofs of the story, first appearing as such in the 1937 animated short Little Red Walking Hood which featured Egghead, directed by Tex Avery. Subsequent appearances of a similar "granny" character included The Cagey Canary (1941), directed by Bob Clampett; Hiss and Make Up (1943), directed by Friz Freleng; and Hare Force (1944), featuring Bugs Bunny and Sylvester the dog (a one-off character distinct from the later Sylvester the cat). Finally, the character was solidified into her current role in Canary Row in 1950, with Bea Benaderet providing her voice. June Foray, who had been providing Granny's voice for her appearances on Capitol Records since 1950, took over the role officially in 1955, and would perform the role for most of the rest of the character's theatrical run. Granny would continue to appear in several more animated shorts from the 1950s on, as a foil for Sylvester the Cat, who was always attempting to eat her pet bird Tweety.

Foray did not voice Granny for her last two theatrical shorts, possibly for budgetary reasons; Ge Ge Pearson and Joan Gerber each voiced the character in one short, both of which were released in 1965. Foray would return to the role in later television productions.

Solo
Although she was almost always shown on-screen with at least one of her two animal companions, Granny could occasionally be seen in an animated short without them. For example, in the 1953 short Hare Trimmed, she starred as a rich widow who was being fought over by two suitors, Yosemite Sam and Bugs Bunny (the latter out to thwart the former's evil plan to marry her and then get her money). Sam called her "Emma" and later "Emmy". Another one was the 1965 short Corn on the Cop, where she appears alongside Daffy Duck and Porky Pig as two Keystone Cops who mistake her for a crook disguised like her. She is in this story addressed as "Mrs. Webster" by Officer Flaherty.

Later appearances
Granny was going to have a cameo in Who Framed Roger Rabbit, but was later dropped for unknown reasons.

She has appeared as a professor at Acme Looniversity and the mentor and favorite teacher of Mary Melody in Tiny Toon Adventures, a regular character in The Sylvester and Tweety Mysteries, and a timekeeper in Bugs Bunny and Taz Time Busters. Granny and Witch Hazel donned cheerleader uniforms for the Tune Squad in the movie Space Jam. She was the children's grandmother and new character Floyd's aunt in Baby Looney Tunes, and made two cameo appearance in Looney Tunes: Back in Action as the main character's next door neighbor, although in one of those appearances this "Granny" was actually the Acme Chairman in disguise. She also appeared in Bah, Humduck! A Looney Tunes Christmas and in Tweety's High-Flying Adventure.

An episode of Loonatics Unleashed featured characters named Queen Grannicus (voiced by Candi Milo), the Royal Tweetums and Sylth Vester (the latter being a parody of Darth Vader). However, another episode features a cameo of Granny herself, apparently still alive in the year 2772.

In The Looney Tunes Show, Granny is one of Bugs and Daffy's neighbors and is voiced again by Foray while her younger self is voiced by Stephanie Courtney, and Sylvester and Tweety are her pets. This version of Granny seems to be somewhat hard-of-hearing and slightly senile. A running gag is that Sylvester is constantly chasing Tweety around her house, to which Granny seems oblivious. In "Eligible Bachelors", it is revealed that during World War II, Granny/Emma was a member of the WAC and along with Tweety she stopped Nazi Colonel Frankenheimer from stealing the Eiffel Tower and various paintings from the Louvre. During the flashback of her World War II adventure to Daffy, she appears as an attractive red-headed young woman in a WAC uniform. In "The Grand Old Duck of York", it is revealed that Granny teaches piano lessons when Daffy wants to learn how to play the piano.

Granny appears in New Looney Tunes voiced by Candi Milo.

Granny appears in Space Jam: A New Legacy voiced by Candi Milo. After she and Speedy Gonzales were picked up from The Matrix part of the Warner Bros. 3000 server-verse, Granny became a member of the Tune Squad during their basketball match against the Goon Squad. In one scene, she defeats Chronos by activating the time-control device on his left shoulder to age him to 132 years. During the credits, a photograph shows Granny going up against Ronda Rousey.

Granny appears as a major character in the 2022 film King Tweety.

References

Looney Tunes characters
Fictional amateur detectives
Film characters introduced in 1950
Animated human characters
Female characters in animation
Fictional World War II veterans